Rüdiger Bernhardt (born 8 September 1940) is a German Germanist and Scandinavist.

Born in Dresden, Bernhardt was a Germanist at the Martin Luther University of Halle-Wittenberg until 1993.

As unofficial collaborator (IME) under the code name "Faust", he provided the Stasi with expert opinions on manuscripts by authors for many years; he thus influenced  of the censorship in East Germany. Bernhardt worked as a Stasi-IM from 1976 to 1989. The files contain 13 typewritten reports, 41 tape copies, 49 oral reports and 60 meeting reports of the agent handling by him. In addition to his expert reports, he reported on the German Studies/Art Studies Section at the University of Halle and on more than 30 persons.

Bernhardt is a member of the

Further reading 
 : Sicherungsbereich Literatur. Schriftsteller und Staatssicherheit in der Deutschen Demokratischen Republik (Ullstein Verlag Nr. 26553). Ullstein, Berlin 1999, .

References

External links 
 
  Jahrestag der Bücherverbrennung "Er ist ein Mann vom Fach", 7 May 2003

1940 births
Living people
Writers from Dresden
Germanists
Old Norse studies scholars
Academic staff of the Martin Luther University of Halle-Wittenberg